Elisabeth Christiane Alvina Wandel, née Møller (January 14, 1850 - December 28, 1926) was a Danish painter. She was known for her portraits and landscape paintings.

Biography
Møller was born in Copenhagen, Denmark. She was the daughter of Andreas Christian Møller and Thora Adelaide Beck. She was a student of Carl Thomsen and Peder Severin Krøyer. She married the art collector Oscar Andreas Wandel (1845-1925) and their home became a gathering place for artists. She was the mother of the painter Sigurd Wandel (1875–1947).

Wandel exhibited at Charlottenborg Spring Exhibition in the years 1887-1900, 1902 and 1912-22, at the Nordic Exhibition of 1888 in Copenhagen, and the Exposition Universelle (1889) in Paris. She also  exhibited  her work at the Palace of Fine Arts and The Woman's Building at the 1893 World's Columbian Exposition in Chicago, Illinois.
 
She died during 1926 in Copenhagen.

Gallery

References

External links

1850 births
1926 deaths
Artists from Copenhagen
19th-century Danish women artists
19th-century Danish painters
20th-century Danish women artists
20th-century Danish painters